8 Blackburn Road is a building in the English village of Ribchester, Lancashire. Standing at the junction of Blackburn Road and Ribblesdale Road, it dates to the early 18th century and is a Grade II listed building. 

It is constructed of sandstone, with a stone-slate roof, in two storeys with an attic and four bays.  The windows have mullions and transoms, and the doorway has an architrave.

Inside, a dog-leg staircase continues up to the attic via four flights. A three-light chamfered mullioned window in the east attic wall is now blocked by the adjoining house.

References

Sources

See also
Listed buildings in Ribchester

External links
View from the road – Google Street View, July 2016

Grade II listed buildings in Lancashire
Buildings and structures in Ribchester
18th-century establishments in England